Steve Eisenhauer (December 1, 1931 – May 1, 2016) was a former American football player.  He was elected to the College Football Hall of Fame in 1994.

References

1931 births
Navy Midshipmen football players
College Football Hall of Fame inductees
2016 deaths
People from Warren County, Pennsylvania
Players of American football from Pennsylvania
American football guards
Military personnel from Pennsylvania